Malcolm J Tucker (born 1947) is a British former international swimmer.

Swimming career
He represented England and won a silver medal in the 440 yards medley and a bronze medal in the 110 yards breaststroke, at the 1966 British Empire and Commonwealth Games in Kingston, Jamaica.

He swam for the Southall Club.

References

1947 births
Living people
British male swimmers
Commonwealth Games medallists in swimming
Commonwealth Games silver medallists for England
Commonwealth Games bronze medallists for England
Swimmers at the 1966 British Empire and Commonwealth Games
Medallists at the 1966 British Empire and Commonwealth Games